Zenji is a masculine Japanese name.

Orthography and meaning
The  used in all the names listed below means "goodness".

Separately,  is a title for Zen masters, placed after their mononymous dharma name. In such cases (for example, Dōgen Zenji), it is neither a given name nor surname.

People
, Japanese advocate of women's education
, Japanese middle-distance runner

Fictional characters
, a character from Food Wars!: Shokugeki no Soma

References

Japanese masculine given names